Sir John Stonhouse, 2nd Baronet (1601 – 14 June 1632) was an English politician who sat in the House of Commons from 1628 to 1629.

Stonhouse was the son of Sir William Stonhouse, 1st Baronet, of Radley, Berkshire. He matriculated at Trinity College, Oxford, on 21 March 1617, aged 15, and transferred to Magdalen College, Oxford, from 1618 to 1622. He was a student of Gray's Inn in 1619. In 1628, he was elected member of parliament for Abingdon and sat until 1629 when King Charles decided to rule without parliament for eleven years. He was knighted in August 1629. He succeeded to the baronetcy on the death of his father in 1632.

Stonhouse died at the age of about 31 and was succeeded in the baronetcy by his brother George.

References

1601 births
1632 deaths
Baronets in the Baronetage of England
English MPs 1628–1629
Alumni of Trinity College, Oxford
Alumni of Magdalen College, Oxford
Members of Gray's Inn
People from Radley